Giulia Masucci Fava (born 1858, Serino, Province of Avellino)  was an Italian painter; she was active mainly in Naples, and is known primarily for figure and genre painting.

Biography
She studied under direction of the professors Vincenzo Volpe and Enrico Rossi.  Among her works were Nel tugurio and Per la sposa, both exhibited at the Promotrice of Naples; Una bambina; and finally Una letterina, exhibited at the Brera Academy in Milan. In 1891, she married the writer Onorato Fava (1859-1941), known mostly for his children's books.

References

1858 births
People from the Province of Avellino
19th-century Italian painters
Italian women painters
Italian genre painters
Year of death missing
19th-century Italian women artists